The 2005 Proximus Diamond Games was a women's professional tennis tournament played on indoor hard courts at the Sportpaleis in Antwerp, Belgium that was part of the Tier II category of the 2005 WTA Tour. It was the fourth edition of the tournament and was held from 14 February until 20 February 2002. First-seeded Amélie Mauresmo won the singles title and earned $93,000 first-prize money.

Finals

Singles

 Amélie Mauresmo defeated  Venus Williams, 4–6, 7–5, 6–4

Doubles

 Cara Black /  Els Callens defeated  Anabel Medina Garrigues /  Dinara Safina, 3–6, 6–4, 6–4

External links
 ITF tournament edition details
 Tournament draws

Proximus Diamond Games
Diamond Games
2005 in Belgian tennis